Pahang is one of the states in Malaysia that awards honours and titles.

2003
 9 recipients of Sri Sultan Ahmad Shah Pahang (SSAP)
 16 recipients of Sri Indera Mahkota Pahang (SIMP)
 16 recipients of Darjah Sultan Ahmad Shah (DSAP) 
 77 recipients of Darjah Indera Mahkota Pahang (DIMP) 
all of which carry the title Dato'''.

2012
In 2012, 796 people received honors in Pahang.
Eleven people received the Sri Sultan Ahmad Shah Pahang (SSAP) award
Those receiving the SSAP included:
Dr. Mohd Irwan Serigar Abdullah, Treasury secretary-general 
Abdul Rahim Mohamad Radzi, Home Ministry secretary-general
Eleven people received the Sri Indera Mahkota Pahang (SIMP) award
Twenty people received the Sultan Ahmad Shah Pahang (DSAP) award
Ninety-eight people received the Indera Mahkota Pahang (DIMP) award
656 people received other awards

2013
In May 2013, the crown prince Abdullah Ahmad Shah, presented awards on behalf of his father at an investiture ceremony at the Abu Bakar Palace in Pekan.
In December 2013, the crown prince Abdullah Ahmad Shah, presented additional awards on behalf of his father.

Sultan Ahmad Shah (SSAP) award
The SSAP medal, and the title Dato' Sri'' was awarded to:
Hassan Malek, Minister of Domestic Trade, Cooperatives and Consumerism
Y.A.A. Tan Sri Dato' Sri Datin Paduka Zaleha Zahari, Federal Court Judge
Syed Ismail Syed Azizan. director of the Bukit Aman Police Headquarters Commercial Crime Investigation Department 
Datuk Seri Adnan Md Ikhsan, Federal Territories Ministry secretary-general 
Alias Ahmad, Immigration Department director-general 
Dr Emel Faizal Mohd Mokhtar, managing director and chief executive of Yayasan Felda 
Dr Goh Tian Chuan, Board of Directors executive chairman of Kumpulan Globaltec Formation 
and six other people.

Other awards May 2013
Six people received the Darjah Sultan Ahmad Shah Pahang (DSAP) award
120 people received the Darjah Indera Mahkota Pahang (DIMP) award
Twelve people received the Setia Ahmad Shah Pahang (SAP) award
Eleven people received the Setia Mahkota Pahang (SMP) award
Twelve people received one of the Ahli Ahmad Shah Pahang (AAP), Ahli Mahkota Pahang (AMP), Pingat Khidmat Cemerlang (PKC) and Pingat Kelakuan Terpuji (PKT) awards
Twenty-four people received the Pingat Jasa Kebaktian (PJK) award

Other awards December 2013
Eleven people received the Darjah Sultan Ahmad Shah Pahang (DSAP) award
114 people received the Darjah Indera Mahkota Pahang (DIMP) award
Ten people received the Setia Ahmad Shah Pahang (SAP) award
Ten people received the Setia Mahkota Pahang (SMP) award
Eleven people received the Ahli Ahmad Shah Pahang (AAP) award
Eleven people received the Ahli Mahkota Pahang (AMP) award

2014
At an investiture ceremony at Abu Bakar Palace, crown prince Abdullah handed out 199 medals and other awards on behalf of his father, Sultan Ahmad Shah.

Dr. Noor Hisham Abdullah, Director-General of Health, was one of four recipients of the Sri Sultan Ahmad Shah (SSAP) award.

2015
Seven people received Darjah Sri Sultan Ahmad Shah Pahang (SSAP) award.
Nine people received the Darjah Sultan Ahmad Shah Pahang (DSAP) award
53 people received the Darjah Indera Mahkota Pahang (DIMP) award
11 people received the Setia Ahmad Shah Pahang (SAP) award
13 people received the Setia Mahkota Pahang (SMP) award

2016
 4 people received Darjah Sri Sultan Ahmad Shah Pahang (SSAP) award.
 83 people received the Darjah Indera Mahkota Pahang (DIMP) award
 22 people received the Darjah Setia Ahmad Shah Pahang (SAP) award
 33 people received the Setia Mahkota Pahang (SMP) award
 18 people received the Darjah Ahli Ahmad Shah Pahang (AAP) award
 52 people received the Ahli Mahkota Pahang (AMP) award

References

External links
Honours list in conjunction with Pahang Sultan Ahmad Shah's 73rd birthday, 26 October 2003.
Orders, Decorations and Medals Pahang.

Malaysian honours list
Honorary titles
Pahang